Historiography is the study of how history is written. One pervasive influence upon the writing of history has been nationalism, a set of beliefs about political legitimacy and cultural identity. Nationalism has provided a significant framework for historical writing in Europe and in those former colonies influenced by Europe since the nineteenth century. Typically official school textbooks are based on the nationalist model and focus on the emergence, trials and successes of the forces of nationalism.

Origins
Although the emergence of the nation into political consciousness is often placed in the nineteenth century, attempts by political leaders to craft new national identities, with their dynasty at the center, have been identified as early as the late Roman Empire. The Barbarian rulers of the successor states crafted these new identities on the basis of descent of the ruler from ancient noble families, a shared descent of a single people with common language, custom, and religious identity, and a definition in law of the rights and responsibilities of members of the new nation.

The eighteenth and nineteenth century saw the resurgence of national ideologies. During the French revolution a national identity was crafted, identifying the common people with the Gauls. In Germany historians and humanists, such as Johann Gottfried Herder and Johann Gottlieb Fichte, identified a linguistic and cultural identity of the German nation, which became the basis of a political movement to unite the fragmented states of this German nation.

A significant historiographical outcome of this movement of German nationalism was the formation of a "Society for Older German Historical Knowledge", which sponsored the editing of a massive collection of documents of German history, the Monumenta Germaniae Historica. The sponsors of the MGH, as it is commonly known, defined German history very broadly; they edited documents concerning all territories where German-speaking people had once lived or ruled. Thus, documents from Italy to France to the Baltic were grist for the mill of the MGH editors.

This model of scholarship focusing on detailed historical and linguistic investigations of the origins of a nation, set by the founders of the MGH, was imitated throughout Europe. In this framework, historical phenomena were interpreted as they related to the development of the nation-state; the state was projected into the past. National histories are thus expanded to cover everything that has ever happened within the largest extent of the expansion of a nation, turning Mousterian hunter-gatherers into incipient Frenchmen. Conversely, historical developments spanning many current countries may be ignored, or analysed from narrow parochial viewpoints.

Time depth and ethnicity

The difficulty faced by any national history is the changeable nature of ethnicity. That one nation may turn into another nation over time, both by splitting (colonization) and by merging (syncretism, acculturation) is implicitly acknowledged by ancient writers; Herodotus describes the Armenians as "colonists of the Phrygians", implying that at the time of writing clearly separate groups originated as a single group. Similarly, Herodotus refers to a time when the "Athenians were just beginning to be counted as Hellenes", implying that a formerly Pelasgian group over time acquired "Greekness". The Alamanni are described by Asinius Quadratus as originally a conglomerate of various tribes which acquired a common identity over time. All these processes are summarized under the term ethnogenesis.

In ancient times, ethnicities often derived their or their rulers' origin from divine or semi-divine founders of a mythical past (for example, the Anglo-Saxons deriving their dynasties from Woden; see also Euhemerism). In modern times, such mythical aetiologies in nationalist constructions of history were replaced by the frequent attempt to link one's own ethnic group to a source as ancient as possible, often known not from tradition but only from archaeology or philology, such as Armenians claiming as their origin the Urartians, the Albanians claiming as their origin the Illyrians, the Georgians claiming as their origin the Mushki—all of the mentioned groups being known only from either ancient historiographers or archaeology.

Nationalism and ancient history

Nationalist ideologies frequently employ results of archaeology and ancient history as propaganda, often significantly distorting them to fit their aims, cultivating national mythologies and national mysticism. Frequently this involves the uncritical identification of one's own ethnic group with some ancient or even prehistoric (known only archaeologically) group, whether mainstream scholarship accepts as plausible or reject as pseudoarchaeology the historical derivation of the contemporary group from the ancient one. The decisive point, often assumed implicitly, that it is possible to derive nationalist or ethnic pride from a population that lived millennia ago and, being known only archaeologically or epigraphically, is not remembered in living tradition.

Examples include Kurds claiming identity with the Medes, Albanians claiming as their origin the Illyrians, Bulgarians claiming identity with the Thracians, Iraqi propaganda invoking Sumer or Babylonia, Georgians claiming as their origin the Mushki, —all of the mentioned groups being known only from either ancient historiographers or archaeology. In extreme cases, nationalists will ignore the process of ethnogenesis altogether and claim ethnic identity of their own group with some scarcely attested ancient ethnicity known to scholarship by the chances of textual transmission or archaeological excavation.

Historically, various hypotheses regarding the Urheimat of the Proto-Indo-Europeans has been a popular object of patriotic pride, quite regardless of their respective scholarly values:
Albanian nationalism: The descent from the Illyrians and Pelasgians
Dacianism or Dacomania is the corresponding concept in Romanian nationalism.
Greek nationalism: The supposedly Greek origins of the ancient Thracians, Illyrians and of the Minoan civilization. 
Northern European origins of an Aryan race (Germanic mysticism, Nazi mysticism, Ahnenerbe)
Lithuanian Sarmatism: The Lithianian origins of the Goths, Sarmatians and other Eastern European peoples.
Pan-Turkism and Neo-Eurasianism postulate mythical origins of humanity or culture in Central Asia, (Sun Language Theory, Arkaim)
Slavic nationalisms: Polish Sarmatism, Macedonism, Illyrian movement, etc.
Armenian nationalism: Armenia, Subartu and Sumer
Pakistani nationalism: Indus valley civilization
Antiquization: claims continuity between ancient Macedonia and modern North Macedonia

Study
Nationalism was so much taken for granted as the "proper" way to organize states and view history that nationalization of history was essentially invisible to historians until fairly recently. Then scholars such as Ernest Gellner, Benedict Anderson, and Anthony D. Smith made attempts to step back from nationalism and view it critically. Historians began to ask themselves how this ideology had affected the writing of history.

Speaking to an audience of anthropologists, the historian E. J. Hobsbawm pointed out the central role of the historical profession in the development of nationalism:

Martin Bernal's much debated book Black Athena (1987) argues that the historiography on ancient Greece has been in part influenced by nationalism and ethnocentrism. He also claimed that influences by non-Greek or non-Indo-European cultures on Ancient Greek were marginalized.

According to the medieval historian Patrick J. Geary:[The] modern [study of] history was born in the nineteenth century, conceived and developed as an instrument of European nationalism. As a tool of nationalist ideology, the history of Europe's nations was a great success, but it has turned our understanding of the past into a toxic waste dump, filled with the poison of ethnic nationalism, and the poison has seeped deep into popular consciousness.

By country 
Nationalist historiographies have emerged in a number of countries and some have been subject to in-depth scholarly analysis.

Cuba 
In 2007, Kate Quinn presented an analysis of the Cuban nationalist historiography.

Indonesia 
In 2003, Rommel Curaming analyzed the Indonesian nationalistic historiography.

South Korea 
Nationalist historiography in South Korea has been the subject of 2001 study by Kenneth M. Wells.

Thailand 
In 2003, Patrick Jory analyzed the Thai nationalistic historiography.

Zimbabwe 
In 2004, Terence Ranger noted that "Over the past two or three years there has emerged in Zimbabwe a sustained attempt by the Mugabe regime to propagate what is called ‘patriotic history’."

See also
Afrocentrism
Gothicism
Historical revisionism
Historical revisionism (negationism)
Irredentism
Nationalisms Across the Globe
National myth
Nationalism and archaeology
Nazi archaeology
Primordialism
Romantic nationalism
Politics of archaeology in Israel and Palestine

References

Further reading

Nationalism in general
 Anderson, Benedict. Imagined Communities: Reflections on the Origin and Spread of Nationalism, 2nd. ed. London: Verso, 1991. 
 Bond, George C. and Angela Gilliam (eds.) Social Construction of the Past: Representation as Power. London: Routledge, 1994. 
 Díaz-Andreu, Margarita. A World History of Nineteenth-Century Archaeology. Nationalism, Colonialism and the Past. Oxford, Oxford University Press, 2007. 
 Díaz-Andreu, Margarita and Champion, Tim (eds.) Nationalism and Archaeology in Europe. London: UCL Press; Boulder, Co.: Westview Press, 1996.  (UCL Press);  (hb) & 978-0813330518 (pb) (Westview)
Ferro, Marc. The Use and Abuse of History: Or How the Past Is Taught to Children. London:Routledge, 2003, 
 
 Gellner, Ernest. Nations and Nationalism. Ithaca: Cornell University Press, 1983. 
 Hobsbawm, Eric. Nations and Nationalism since 1780. Cambridge: Cambridge University Press, 1992. 
 Hobsbawm, Eric J. and Terence Ranger, ed.. The Invention of Tradition. Cambridge: Cambridge University Press, 1992 
 Kohl, Philip L. "Nationalism and Archaeology: On the Constructions of Nations and the Reconstructions of the Remote past", Annual Review of Anthropology, 27, (1998): 223–246.
 Smith, Anthony D. The Ethnic Origins of Nations. Oxford: Blackwell Publishers, 1988. 
 Suny, Ronald Grigor. "Constructing Primordialism: Old Histories for New Nations", The Journal of Modern History, 73, 4 (Dec, 2001): 862–896.
Bergunder, Michael Contested Past: Anti-Brahmanical and Hindu nationalist reconstructions of Indian prehistory, Historiographia Linguistica, Volume 31, Number 1, 2004, 59–104.
G. Fagan (ed.), Archaeological Fantasies: How Pseudoarchaeology Misrepresents the Past and Misleads the Public Routledge (2006), .
Kohl, Fawcett (eds.), Nationalism, Politics and the Practice of Archaeology, Cambridge University Press (1996), 
Bruce Lincoln, Theorizing Myth: Narrative, Ideology, and Scholarship, University of Chicago Press (2000), .

Specific nationalisms
Baltic
 Krapauskas, Virgil. Nationalism and Historiography: The Case of Nineteenth-Century Lithuanian Historicism. Boulder, Colo.: East European Monographs, 2000. 
Celtic
 Chapman, Malcolm. The Celts: The Construction of a Myth. New York: St. Martin's Press, 1992. 
 Dietler, Michael. "'Our Ancestors the Gauls': Archaeology, Ethnic Nationalism, and the Manipulation of Celtic Identity in Modern Europe". American Anthropologist, N.S. 96 (1994): 584–605.
 James, Simon. The Atlantic Celts: Ancient People or Modern Invention? London: British Museum Press, 1999. 
Chinese
 Duara, Prasenjit. Rescuing History from the Nation: Questioning Narratives of Modern China. Chicago: University of Chicago Press, 1997 
Israeli
 Abu El-Haj, Nadia. Facts on the Ground: Archaeological Practice and Territorial Self-Fashioning in Israeli Society. Chicago: University of Chicago Press, 2001. 
 Uri Ram, The Future of the Past in Israel – A Sociology of Knowledge Approach, in Benny Morris, Making Israel, the University of Michigan Press, 2007.
Pakistan
 Raja, Masood Ashraf. Constructing Pakistan: Foundational Texts and the Rise of Muslim National Identity, 1857–1947, Oxford 2010, 
Spanish
 Díaz-Andreu, Margarita 2010. "Nationalism and Archaeology. Spanish Archaeology in the Europe of Nationalities". In Preucel, R. and Mrozowksi, S. (eds.), Contemporary Archaeology in Theory and Practice. London, Blackwell: 432–444.

Recent conferences
 Nationalism, Historiography and the (Re)construction of the Past, University of Birmingham, 10–12 September 2004

External links

 "Encyclopedia of 1848 Revolutions", comprehensive collection of new articles by modern scholars

Nationalism
Nationalism
National mysticism
National histories
Nationalism and archaeology